David Zafrir Berlin (born May 14, 1951) is a Canadian editor, writer, politician, educator best known for being the co-founder and first editor of The Walrus from 2003 to 2004 and former editor and owner of the Literary Review of Canada from 1998 to 2001. He has edited several books including What’s Left: The New Democratic Party in Renewal (2001) as well as over a hundred essays and articles.

Berlin was born in Israel in 1951 but raised in Toronto, where his family settled in 1953. He returned to Israel in 1970, living there for eight years, before returning to Canada.

He served his military duty with the Israeli Army in the reconnaissance unit, Sayeret Shaked under Ariel Sharon's command and took part in Sharon's Suez campaign during the Yom Kippur War in 1973. He attended medical school at Tel-Aviv University and then graduated from the University of Chicago's program on social and political thought, and taught at several universities.

Berlin's writing has appeared in Saturday Night, the Literary Review of Canada,  The Globe and Mail, the National Post and Ha'aretz among other publications.

Berlin was the New Democratic Party of Canada's candidate in Toronto Centre in the 2000 federal election. In 2015, he founded and led of The Bridge Party of Canada, running as its candidate in University—Rosedale in the 2015 federal election. The party was deregistered on January 31, 2017.

In 2011, Berlin wrote The Moral Lives of Israelis: Reinventing the Dream State in which he argued for Israel to become "not a Jewish state, but only a state rather like New York City – a state in which many Jews live."

In June 2017, Berlin announced his candidacy for the leadership of the NDP. However, he was unable to submit a deposit and the required number of nominating signatures by the July 3, 2017 deadline and thus did not qualify as a candidate.

Electoral record

References 

Living people
Jewish Canadian writers
Canadian magazine editors
Canadian book editors
1951 births
Israeli emigrants to Canada
University of Chicago alumni
21st-century Canadian non-fiction writers
New Democratic Party candidates for the Canadian House of Commons
Canadian political party founders
21st-century Canadian male writers
Canadian male non-fiction writers